The Battle of Manila (1574) (Filipino: Labanan sa Maynila ng 1574) was a battle in the Manila area mainly in the location of what is now Parañaque between Chinese and Japanese pirates, led by Limahong, and the Spanish colonial forces and their native allies. The battle occurred on November 29, 1574 when Limahong's fleet landed in the town of Parañaque and from there, began to assault the fortifications of Intramuros. Initially, the inhabitants where disorganized and Limahong's forces routed them. Furthermore, the Chinese killed the Master-of-Camp of the Spanish, Martin de Goiti. This caused them to delay their assault on Manila as Martin de Goiti's house was an obstacle in their march.

Limahong's forces laid siege to Manila until a force, led by Juan de Salcedo, of fifty Spanish musketeers broke the siege. Having been defeated at Manila, Limahong retreated and abandoned his plans to invade Manila and instead settled in Pangasinan. A year later, forces again led by Salcedo defeated Limahong, leading to the Viceroy of Fukien to travel to the Philippines for the initial purpose of securing the release of Limahong, but ultimately establishing diplomatic relations between China and the Spanish Philippines.

Background
The first Spanish expedition arrived in the region in 1565, but the city would not be founded until 1571. Once established, Manila became a central center of commerce with multiple nations from south Asia, as well as China and Japan, which traded with porcelain, silk and wood. Manila's fame as a rich city spread quickly around southern Asia, attracting the interest of pirates and marauders.

In 1574, Chinese warlord Limahong set out for Manila. He had been just expelled from China by the imperial fleet in a battle in Guangdong, and was looking for moving his headquarters to the Filipinas islands, where he could obtain greater gains with less difficulty. After capturing a Chinese trader ship that carried Spanish sailors, he found out Manila only had a garrison of around 200 Spanish soldiers available, so he judged it would be easy to capture the city in a surprise attack.

In November, guided by the Spanish prisoners, Limahong arrived in Luzón with a fleet formed by around 60 junks, gathered to expel the Spaniards and take the city. His contingent was composed by 2000 soldiers, 2000 sailors and 1500 colonists, including entire families, ransom women captured in China and Japan, farmers, carpenters, artisans, doctors and all goods necessary to establish a settlement. He only left a small part in the island of Batán, where he had taken refuge from the Chinese imperial fleet.

Limahong was helped by a Japanese lieutenant, Sioco (likely a Spanish language corruption of "Shoko"), and according to Japanese sources, he acted in alliance with factions of wokou, with the result that probably an important part of his forces were Japanese pirates. Spanish sources also describe the invaders' sabers as catanes, a corruption of the Japanese word katana, along with more traditional Chinese weapons. It is also apparent he had a Portuguese translator in his fleet.

Opposing forces
According to all sources, both sides were matched in weapons and equipment. The main difference in the battle was seemingly the superior experience and training of the Spanish soldiers, as well as their defensive positions, the opportune arrivals of reinforcements and other tactical considerations. Both armies employed arquebuses and small artillery pieces, as well as swords and daggers, and the Asians carried long-tipped pikes (described as being "enough by themselves to undo the thickest hauberks") and several kinds of sabers, catanes and scimitars. Among protective equipment there were steel armors, mails and cloth gambesons, those especially worn by the Asians. The pirates also used a great quantity of gunpowder hand grenades and incendiary artifacts.

Battle
Limahong's fleet was spotted by Spanish posts in the northern part of Luzón, commanded by Juan de Salcedo and Francisco de Saavedra. Three messengers were sent by sea, but lack of wind caused the pirate fleet to catch up with them, forcing the Spaniards to abandon the boats and continue on foot by land. As a consequence, it was not possible to send the message in time.

First attack
On 30 November, Limahong deployed Sioco to perform a night raid with 400-600 pirates and capture the unaware city by surprise. However, the plan failed, as Limahong had ordered to execute the Spanish prisoners upon arriving to the beach; as the pirates did not have the prisoners' knowledge of the whereabouts anymore, Sioco's expedition fell in dangerous currents, losing three boats and being drifted by mistake towards Parañaque. Sioco decided to continue on foot to Manila while towing the launches with ropes.

The pirates were spotted after a handful of attacks on Manila locals, who believed mistakenly that Sioco and his group were Muslims bandits from Borneo. Governor Martín de Goiti was informed in his house near the old San Agustin Church, but he dismissed it and only sent ten guards to find out what was happening, without sounding alarms or informing the garrison. The pirates quickly killed the guards and besieged the house, where Goiti's wife Lucía del Corral taunted them from the window. Infuriated by the insults and checking out the house was still well fortified, Sioco ordered it to be set in fire. Finally understanding the dire situation, Goiti and the few men inside sallied out against the pirates in a suicide attack. The governor was elderly and sick at the time, but tradition has that he jumped from a low window in his rush to engage his enemies. It is also believed that the Chinese pirates cut his nose and ears as human war trophies. The house was destroyed, the only survivors being Del Corral and soldier Francisco de Astigarribia.

With Goiti dead, Sioco resumed his march towards Manila, but the locals had heard the battle and warned the garrison in time for the defense to be prepared. The next in command was Lavezaris, whose house was located in the opposite point to the city. Sioco's force was met outside the walls by a nearby team of 20 arcabuceros commanded by Lorenzo Chachón, who harassed them into stopping. However, their numerical advantage allowed the pirates to encircle Chacón and press on them, killing eight before the rest could cut their way towards the city. The Chinese pirates gave them pursuit, but another company of 80 Spanish soldiers under Alonso Velázquez attacked them from the flank. Sioco, realizing tactical advantage was lost and likely fearing the intervention of more Spanish reinforcements, called for a retreat to Cavite, where they had accorded to reunite with Limahong.

Sioco and his forces embarked in Limahong's fleet and planned a second attack after resting for two days. For his part, Lavezaris summoned to Manila all the nearby soldiers and built fortifications, rightly predicting a new assault. The situation in Manila was conflicted, as many still believed the pirates worked for the raja of Borneo, so Lavezaris arrested two local Muslim chieftains, Numanatay and Rajabago, suspecting they might be enemy insiders. The truth is unknown, although the two later were revealed to have been strangled in their cells. Shortly after, Salcedo reached Manila with his own reinforcements, so Lavezaris promoted him to the Maestre de Campo title vacated by Goiti, leaving Salcedo's own command to Gaspar Ramírez, Velázquez's ensign. Spanish forces by this point were 150-200 Iberian soldiers and 200 Ilocano warriors from Bauang, along with some militiamen.

Second attack
On the night of December 2, Limahong's fleet was spotted arriving in Manila. The first artillery exchanges happened at daybreak, when the fleet anchored down and deployed 1,500 pirates commanded again by Sioco. Their launches were sent back to the ships so they would be properly motivated to fight without possible retreat. After setting fire many coastal houses with incendiary grenades, including the San Agustín Church, Sioco ordered his troops to divide in three contingents, hoping to attract the Spaniards outside where they could envelope them from three sides. However, Lavezaris deduced his strategy and forbad his soldiers to leave the walls, not even when the Chinese fleet moved to find better shooting positions, as the Spanish defensive positions allowed them greater safety to return fire and inflict damage. Finally, Sioco's hand was forced under fire, and he gave the order to assault the walls in a two-pronged attack, leaving his third company in rearguard.

The citizens initially repulsed all attacks, but one of the Spanish commanders of alabarderos, Ensign Sancho Ortiz, was overwhelmed and shot down, with the result that his bulwark became open to the Chinese pirates. The pirates entered the city and engaged the forces of Salcedo and Francisco de León, Manila's mayor, at the same time as Spanish artillery overpowered the Chinese fleet and pushed it out of the harbor. The main battle happened them in the streets, where León was killed by pirates, but shortly after it was Sioco himself who was taken down by a Spanish marksman. Unsupported and with their main captains dead, the Chinese pirates were finally expelled from the walls.

While the battle raged, turbulence took place behind the Spanish lines. Assuming the Spaniards would be defeated, groups of natives capitalized on the battle to sack empty houses, and a mass of slaves broke out with the intention to escape. They stole launches and tried to flee through the Pasig River, but they did so with such haste that several boats were overturned and many slaves drowned; they were also attacked by other natives, who saw the chance to take revenge for previous servitudes and enmities. There were also riots in Tondo and Mindoro, where the locals sacked Christian churches and took hostages among the clergymen to offer to Limahong as tributes in case of his victory.

Salcedo drove the pirates to the beach and inflicted many casualties, but they were forced to return to the walls when Limahong returned with several ships to deploy reinforcements of 400 soldiers. Limahong also called one of the three companies left by Sioco, gathering around 1000 men in total, but he judged useless to try any more assaults and called out the attack. His men were sent to sack the nearby places while Limahong set two stranded ships in fire, hoping to deviate Salcedo's attention, but the Spanish captain saw through the ruse and fell over the sackers. Ultimately, Limahong summoned all his soldiers to his ships and abandoned the shore altogether under fire from Manila.

Last movements
Limahong headed to Parañaque, which he pillaged, while Salcedo rebuilt Manila and prepared for a possible third attack. A confusion took place when many torches were spotted at the beach by night, but they turned out to be just locals of Luzón looting the Chinese pirates corpses, and afterwards the city was informed that Limahong's fleet had definitely retreated northwardly. After the battle, one of the local militiamen, Galo, was rewarded with the Spanish title of don due to his bravery and leadership.

While Lavezaris called in forces from Panay, Camarines and Cebu in order to gather a chase fleet, Salcedo was sent to solve the riots in Tondo and Mindoro. He personally convinced chieftain Lakandula to surrender and free the religious hostages, who had been tortured with fire.

Chase to Pangasinan
The remnants of Limahong's fleet were later discovered in an island of the Agno river in Pangasinan, where Francisco de Saavedra had traveled to warn the Ilocans from the pirate. Limahong had installed his settlement there, spreading propaganda about a supposed victory over the Spaniards and promising falsely a government rich and without tributes, apparently hoping to cause a revolt against the Spanish. Saavedra was betrayed by the natives, who sold him to Limahong, but he deduced it in time and managed to return to Manila with the news. Three months after, in March 1575, Lavezaris launched the anticipated expedition to punish Limahong, reuniting 60 ships manned by 250 soldiers, 400 sailors and 1,700 indigenous warriors, including some Ilocanos unhappy with the warlord.

Having found out that Limahong had 2000 fighters, Salcedo blocked the river with chained ships and fortified the shores. After the first contacts, he sent his captains Lorenzo Chacón, Pedro de Chaves and Gabriel de Rivera, along with many warriors to disable the Chinese ships, capturing some and burning the rest to leave the Chinese pirates without a way to escape. Their group found a way into the settlement and battled Limahong's forces in its outer wall, being impeded from advancing further only because they became distracted sacking the riches and women they found. Nonetheless, they closed the battle mounting a tight siege on the compound.

The siege went on for four months, hoping to surrender Limahong by hunger. Chinese commander Pesung Aumon arrived unexpectedly to help negotiations, offering Limahong either becoming a privateer for emperor Wanli or being annihilated by the Chinese fleet, but Limahong refused, as he had a plan to escape. After sacrificing his wounded men, warlord managed to break out artfully from the siege, moving improvised boats through a channel he excavated secretly, and disappeared into the sea. A last contact happened in cape Bojeador in Luzon, where Limahong was surprised by a storm before safely escaping.

Aftermath
The termination of the conflict brought the first political relationships between Spain and China. Aumon asked Lavezaris to be able to pay for the Chinese captives, as among them there were kidnapped noblewomen, but the Spanish governor gifted them to him for free, accepting only to send a Spanish embassy to the emperor. The expedition was directed by churchmen Martín de Rada and Jerónimo Martín and assisted by Chinese merchant Sinsay, a long time friend of the Spaniards, and carried orders to get commercial relationships. However, although several others embassies were sent, diplomacy became cold due to the mismanagement of new governor Francisco de Sande. For his part, Limahong would be defeated in Palau by the Chinese navy, commanded by viceroy Wang Wanggao of Fujian, and escaped in a single ship, offering his services in Siam and India before disappearing from the historical record.

In popular culture
The battle is mentioned in Walter Robb's essay Walls Of Manila.

References

 Stearn, Duncan, Chronology of South-East Asian History 1400-1996 (Dee Why, NSW: The Mitraphab Centre Pty Ltd., 1997).
 "La Relación del suceso de la venida del tirano chino del gobernador Guido de Lavezares (1575): Épica española en Asia en el siglo XVI:" Edición, transcripción y notas (incluye facsimil del manuscrito original), Juan Francisco Maura. Lemir  (Departamento de Filología Hispánica de la Universidad de Valencia),  2004.

Battles involving the Philippines
Battles involving Spain
History of Manila
1574 in military history